Japanese Friendship Garden is used to describe many gardens including:

Japanese Friendship Garden (Balboa Park) in San Diego, California
Japanese Friendship Garden (Kelley Park) in San Jose, California
Ro Ho En in Phoenix, Arizona
Nikka Yuko Japanese Garden in Lethbridge, Alberta
Yuko-En on the Elkhorn, Kentucky-Japan Friendship Garden in Georgetown, Kentucky
Friendship Garden in Hope, British Columbia